Romina Holz (born 28 January 1988) is a former German footballer. She most played for 1. FC Saarbrücken.

Honours

1. FC Saarbrücken 
2. Bundesliga: Winner (1) 2008–09
German Cup: Runner-up (1) 2007–08

References

External links 
 
 

1988 births
Living people
Sportspeople from Saarbrücken
German women's footballers
1. FC Saarbrücken (women) players
SC 07 Bad Neuenahr players
Women's association football goalkeepers
Footballers from Saarland